Roland Adhemar Cowell (September 22, 1895 – August 27, 1953) was an American football, basketball, and baseball coach and college athletics administrator. Contemporary newspaper reports often referred to him as R. A. Cowell.

Cowell served as the head football coach at the University of Mississippi (Ole Miss) from 1922 to 1923, Des Moines University, from 1924 to 1925 and Northern Illinois State Teachers College—now known as Northern Illinois University—from 1926 to 1928. Cowell was also the head basketball coach at Northern Illinois from 1926 to 1929 and the head baseball coach at the school from 1927 to 1929. Cowell was an assistant coach in basketball, baseball, and track at Ole Miss.

Cowell was a graduate of the University of Illinois. His brother, Butch Cowell, was also a coach and administrator in college athletics.

Head coaching record

Football

References

External links
 

1895 births
1953 deaths
Des Moines Tigers football coaches
Northern Illinois Huskies athletic directors
Northern Illinois Huskies baseball coaches
Northern Illinois Huskies football coaches
Northern Illinois Huskies men's basketball coaches
Ole Miss Rebels baseball coaches
Ole Miss Rebels football coaches
Ole Miss Rebels men's basketball coaches
College track and field coaches in the United States
University of Illinois Urbana-Champaign alumni